No Limit may refer to:

Music

Record labels
No Limit Records, a record label founded by Master P
No Limit Forever Records, a record label founded by Romeo Miller, son of Master P

Albums
No Limit (Art Pepper album), 1977
No Limit (Mari Iijima album), 1999
No Limit (EP), by Monsta X, 2021
No Limit, a 2021 compilation album with Ninho, Orelsan, Heuss l'Enfoiré, Bosh, and others

Songs
"No Limit" (2 Unlimited song), 1993
"No Limit" (G-Eazy song), 2017
"No Limit" (Usher song), 2016
"No Limit", a song by Front Line Assembly from their album Gashed Senses & Crossfire
"No Limit", a song by G Herbo from his mixtape Ballin Like I'm Kobe
"No Limit", a song by Inna from her album I Am the Club Rocker
"No Limit", a song by Skeme featuring The Game
"No Limit", a song by Wiz Khalifa from his album O.N.I.F.C.

Film and television 
No Limit (1931 film), starring Clara Bow
No Limit (1935 film), a comedy about the Isle of Man TT Race, starring George Formby and Florence Desmond
No Limit (2006 film), a documentary about the professional poker tournament circuit
No Limit (2011 film), a Chinese comedy / action film directed by Fu Huayang
No Limit (2022 flim), :fr:Sous emprise a French Drama / Romance film
Heading to the Ground, also known as No Limit, a 2009 South Korean TV series
No Limit (TV series), a 2012 French action TV show created by Luc Besson and starring Vincent Elbaz

Sports and gaming 
No Limit (professional wrestling), a professional wrestling tag team
A discipline of freediving
A poker betting, term

See also 
No Limits (disambiguation)